"Little Boy Blue" is an English-language nursery rhyme. It has a Roud Folk Song Index number of 11318.

Lyrics
A common version of the rhyme is:

Little Boy Blue, 
Come blow your horn,
The sheep's in the meadow, 
The cow's in the corn.
Where's The boy
Who looks after the sheep?
He's under the haystack,
Fast asleep.
Will you wake him?
No, not I,
For if I do,
He'll sure to cry.

Origins and meaning
The earliest printed version of the rhyme is in Tommy Thumb's Little Song Book (c. 1744), but the rhyme may be much older. It may be alluded to in Shakespeare's King Lear (III, vi) when Edgar, masquerading as Mad Tom, says:

Sleepest or wakest thou, jolly shepheard?
Thy sheepe be in the corne;
And for one blast of thy minikin mouth
Thy sheepe shall take no harme.

It has been argued that Little Boy Blue was intended to represent Cardinal Wolsey, who was the son of an Ipswich butcher, who may have acted as a hayward to his father's livestock, but there is no corroborative evidence to support this assertion. A more plausible, simpler, suggestion, avoiding any reference to Wolsey, is made by George Homans in his book English Villagers of the 13th Century, who writes, after quoting Piers Plowman's description of the hayward and his horn: "The hayward's horn, his badge of office, must have been used to give warning that cattle or other trespassers were in the corn. Little Boy Blue was a hayward."

References

Child characters in literature
Cattle in literature
Fictional sheep
Fictional shepherds
Fictional musicians
Songs about children
Songs about musicians
Songs about musical instruments
Songs about shepherds
English nursery rhymes
Songwriter unknown
Year of song unknown
18th-century songs
English folk songs
English children's songs
Traditional children's songs